Monarcas Morelia Femenil was a Mexican women's football club based in Morelia, Michoacán, Mexico. Established in 2017, the club was the female section of Monarcas Morelia. The team was relocated to Mazatlán in the summer of 2020.

Players

Current squad
As of 5 May 2020

References

Liga MX Femenil teams
 
Morelia
Grupo Salinas
TV Azteca
Association football clubs established in 2017
Women's association football clubs in Mexico
2017 establishments in Mexico